Idaho, a state in the western region of the United States of America, hosts a large number of Native Americans who have traditionally lived in the northern expanses of the Great Basin and the Rocky Mountains. There are five Native American languages that are spoken by recognized tribes of Idaho, two of which fall under the Uto-Aztecan languages classification, while the other three fall under three other language families that are associated with linguistic regions to the west and east of Idaho.

Distribution
There are five Native American languages currently spoken in Idaho. Population estimates are based on figures from Ethnologue and U.S. Census data, as given in sub-pages below. The five languages are shown in the table below:

See also
Native Americans in the United States
Indigenous peoples of the Great Basin
Indigenous languages of the Americas
Uto-Aztecan languages
Kootenai language
Salishan languages
Plateau Penutian languages

Notes

References

Indigenous languages of the North American Great Basin
Indigenous languages of the Pacific Northwest Coast
 
Native American history of Idaho